Marvin is an unincorporated community in Morgan County, in the U.S. state of Missouri.

History
A post office called Marvin was established in 1904, and remained in operation until 1938. The community has the name of H. L. Marvin, a railroad official.

References

Unincorporated communities in Morgan County, Missouri
Unincorporated communities in Missouri